The 2013–14 Campeonato Nacional de Seniores was the first season of the newly created third-tier football league in Portugal after the merging of the Segunda Divisão and Terceira Divisão. It began on 25 August 2013 and finished on 10 June 2014.

This first edition consisted of 19 clubs from the District Championships, 39 from the Segunda Divisão, 19 from the Terceira Divisão and the three teams relegated from the Segunda Liga during the 2012–13 season, making 80 clubs.

S.C. Freamunde won the overall competition, defeating Clube Oriental de Lisboa 3–2 in the final.

Overview

The league was divided in eight series of 10 clubs placed geographically, with the exception of teams from Madeira Islands (divided through the first series) and from the Azores Islands (divided through the last series).

After a First Stage in a home-and-away system, the first two best placed teams of each league played in two groups of 8 teams in a Second Stage with each league winner earning a promotion to the Segunda Liga, plus a two-round play-off winner between the two second placed teams. The two group winners then played a Grand Final on neutral ground for the overall Campeonato Nacional title.

The remaining 8 clubs from each league from the First Stage played in 8 different groups with the last two placed teams being relegated to the District Championships. The 6th placed teams from those leagues then played a two-round play-off with between themselves to decide the remaining four clubs to be relegated.

Teams
Qualified teams:

Relegated from Segunda Liga:
 Naval
 V. Guimarães "B"
 Freamunde

From the Second Division (3rd level until 2012–13):

North Zone
 Amarante
 Boavista
 Fafe
 Famalicão
 Gondomar
 Joane
 Limianos
 Mirandela
 Ribeirão
 Tirsense
 Vizela
 Varzim
 Vilaverdense

Center Zone
 Anadia
 Benfica Castelo Branco
 Bustelo
 Cesarense
 Cinfães
 Coimbrões
 Nogueirense
 Operário
 Sporting de Espinho
 Pampilhosa
 São João de Ver
 Sousense
 Tourizense

South Zone
 1.º de Dezembro
 Carregado
 Casa Pia
 Fátima
 Futebol Benfica
 Louletano
 Mafra
 Oriental
 Pinhalnovense
 Quarteirense
 Sertanense
 Torreense
 União de Leiria

Promoted from the Third Division (4th level until 2012–13):

Series A
 Bragança
 Santa Maria
 Vianense

Series B 
 Felgueiras 1932
 AD Oliveirense

Series C
 Estarreja
 Grijó
 Salgueiros 08

Series D 
 Alcanenense
 Caldas
 Sourense

Series E 
 Barreirense
 Lourinhanense
 Sintrense

Series F 
 Esperança Lagos
 Moura
 União de Montemor

Series Azores 
 Praiense 
 Sporting Ideal

Promoted from the District Championships (5th level until 2012–13):

 Algarve FA: Ferreiras
 Aveiro FA: Lusitânia Lourosa
 Beja FA: Almodôvar
 Braga FA: Ninense
 Bragança FA: Vila Flor
 Castelo Branco FA: Águias do Moradal
 Coimbra FA: Carapinheirense
 Évora FA: no team 
 Guarda FA: Manteigas
 Leiria FA: Portomosense
 Lisboa FA: Loures
 Madeira FA: Camacha 
 Portalegre FA: O Elvas
 Porto FA: Lixa and Perafita
 Santarém FA: Atlético Riachense
 Setúbal FA: Cova da Piedade
 Viana do Castelo FA: Valenciano
 Vila Real FA: Pedras Salgadas
 Viseu FA: Lusitano Vildemoinhos

First stage

Serie A

Serie B

Serie C

Serie D

Serie E

Serie F

Serie G

Serie H

Second stage

Promotion groups

North Zone

South Zone

Third place playoff

First leg

Second leg

Vitória de Guimarães B is promoted to 2014–15 Segunda Liga.

Grand final

Relegation Groups

Serie A

Serie B

Serie C

Serie D

Serie E

Serie F

Serie G

Serie H

6th places playouts

Notes

References

Campeonato Nacional de Seniores seasons
3
Por